Fantastic Locations: Fane of the Drow is an adventure module for the 3.5 edition of the Dungeons & Dragons fantasy role-playing game.

Premise
In Fantastic Locations: Fane of the Drow, the player characters must aid a group of dwarves deep beneath the earth, as their mithril mines come under attack from drow raiders.

Publication history
Fantastic Locations: Fane of the Drow was written by Gwendolyn F.M. Kestrel, and was published in September 2005. Cover art was by Mark Sasso, with interior art by Chad Sergesketter.

Reception

References

Dungeons & Dragons modules
Role-playing game supplements introduced in 2005